The Definitive Collection is a greatest hits collection by American rock and roll singer and musician Elvis Presley. It was first released in 2005, as a European album, by Reader's Digest Association, and distributed by Sony BMG, as a five-disc set, containing 115 songs. It was later released in Europe and Australia, on April 24, 2016, as a four-disc set, containing 93 songs. The album was then made available for download, through digital platforms. The 5-disc set was released in South America, and the 4-disc in Europe.

The European 5-disc release includes a 28-page booklet, containing 16 pictures of Elvis, except for the German release, which includes 14 pictures, whereas the European and Australian 4-disc edition includes a 24-page booklet, containing 14 pictures of Elvis. All releases' booklets include liner notes about Elvis' life. The European digital download presents a different track order, and contains one extra song, with a total of 94, and the South American digital download suffered a small alteration in the track order.

Track listing

Europe 5-CD Set

Europe / Australia 4-CD Set

Europe digital download

South America digital download

Formats
 CD Europe Standard edition – 5-disc edition containing 115 songs, including a 28-page booklet, containing 16 pictures of Elvis, and liner notes about Elvis' life.
 CD Germany Standard edition – 5-disc edition containing 115 songs, including a 28-page booklet, containing 14 pictures of Elvis, and liner notes about Elvis' life.
 CD Europe and Australia 2006 edition – 4-disc edition release, containing 93 songs, including a 24-page booklet, containing 16 pictures of Elvis, and liner notes about Elvis' life.
 Digital download Europe – European digital edition, containing the same 94 songs from the European and Australian CD edition, but with a different track order.
 Digital download South America – South American digital edition, containing the same 115 songs from the European 5-CD edition, but with a slightly different track order.

Personnel 
Credits adapted from the album's liner notes.

Production 

Compilation – Richard Dinnadge
Compilation (With Thanks To) – Henri Heymans, Meir Malinsky, Roger Menz, Roger Semon, Stuart Rubin
Repertoire Administration – Daniel Sankey

Design 

Design – Green Ink
Liner Notes – Colin Escott
Liner Notes Edited By – Richard Lutterloch
Production and Print – Claudette Bramble

References

Elvis Presley compilation albums
2005 greatest hits albums
Sony BMG compilation albums
Compilation albums published posthumously